MV Wotan was a  tanker that was built in 1913 by Reiherstieg Schiffswerft & Maschinenfabrik, Hamburg, Germany. Requisitioned by the Imperial German Navy in 1914, she served until 1915 as SMS A and was then returned to her owners. Ceded to the United States in 1919, she was operated until 1920 then laid up following an engine failure.

In 1927, she was sold to Italian owners. She was sold into merchant service in 1948 and renamed SS Kleinella, serving as a storage hulk at Gibraltar until 1953, when she was scrapped.

Description
The ship was built in 1913 by Reiherstieg Schiffswerft und Maschinenfabrik, Hamburg, as yard number 447. Completion was in August 1913.

Originally, the ship was propelled by diesel engine. This engine was built by Gutehoffnungshütte, Oberhausen, Germany.

History
Wotan was built for the Deutsche-Amerikanische Petroleum Gesellschaft, Hamburg, one of the earliest motor vessels constructed.  was the first, being completed in 1912. In August 1914, she was requisitioned by the Kaiserliche Marine for use as a depôt ship, named A. She was returned to her owners in June 1915. In June 1919, she was delivered to the United States as part of Germany's war reparitions. She was operated under the management of the Standard Oil Co. Wotan departed London on 22 December 1920 bound for New York, but suffered engine trouble on the voyage. She was then laid up at Baltimore, Maryland.

In 1927, Wotan was sold to the Compagnia Italiana Trasporto Olii Minerali, Genoa. The code letters NRJL were allocated. In 1934, her code letters were changed to IBAO.

In June 1940, Gianna M was laid up at Las Palmas, Canary Islands. On 11 May 1941, Gianna M was captured by the Armed Merchant Cruiser  whilst attempting to reach Bordeaux, France. On 13 May, Hilary and Gianna M joined Convoy HG 61, which had departed Gibraltar on 6 May 1941 and arrived at Liverpool on 20 May. On 18 May, Gianna M was slightly damaged in an air raid on the convoy. Gianna M was escorted into Belfast. She was passed to the MoWT and renamed Empire Contract. Her port of registry was changed to London. The Code Letters BPWC and United Kingdom Official Number 149772 were allocated. Initially operated under the management of the Eagle Oil and Shipping Company Ltd, Belfast, management later passed to Davies & Newman Ltd.

In 1945, Empire Control was laid up at Falmouth, Cornwall. It was intended that she would be converted to a factory ship. In 1948, she was sold to the Shell Company of Gibraltar Ltd, London and renamed Kleinella. She was used as a storage hulk at Gibraltar. In 1953, she was sold for scrapping to Clayton & Davie Ltd, Dunston-on-Tyne, Northumberland, arriving on 14 July. Kleinella was scrapped in December 1953.

References

1913 ships
Ships built in Hamburg
Merchant ships of Germany
World War I merchant ships of Germany
Auxiliary ships of the Imperial German Navy
World War I auxiliary ships of Germany
Merchant ships of the United States
Steamships of Italy
Merchant ships of Italy
World War II merchant ships of Italy
Maritime incidents in May 1941
Ministry of War Transport ships
Empire ships
World War II tankers
Steamships of the United Kingdom
Merchant ships of the United Kingdom